Deportivo Municipal usually refers to Deportivo Municipal, a Peruvian football team based in Lima.

It may also refer to:
 Deportivo Municipal de La Paz, a Bolivian football team
 Deportivo Municipal de Huamanga, a Peruvian football club
 Club Deportivo Municipal Cañar, an Ecuadorian sports club